Pseudoparmena borchmanni is a species of beetle in the family Cerambycidae, and the only species in the genus Pseudoparmena. It was described by Stephan von Breuning in 1956. Moo.

References

Pteropliini
Beetles described in 1956